Pavel Gofman (born 26 November 1979) is a USSR-born Israeli gymnast. He competed  at the 2004 Summer Olympics where he finished nineteenth in the all around final.

References

External links
 

1979 births
Living people
Israeli male artistic gymnasts
Olympic gymnasts of Israel
Gymnasts at the 2004 Summer Olympics
Sportspeople from Luhansk